Pauly Valsan is an Indian actress who has been acclaimed for acting in Malayalam films and plays. She debuted in Malayalam film industry with the supporting roles in the 2008 movie Annan Thambi In 2017, she won the Kerala State Film Award for Best Character Actress for her performance in Ee.Ma.Yau directed by Lijo Jose Pellissery and Ottamuri Velicham directed by Rahul Riji Nair.

Personal life
Pauly Valsan hails from Vypin, Kochi, India from a big fisherman family, she is the elder one in the family and have 6 sibling's. She began her acting career through theatre plays as a child artist. Her husband Valsan is also a theatre artist. The couple have two children.

Acting career
Pauly Valsan begin her acting career with theatre plays on early 1970s, and later in 2008 Pauly debuted on Malayalam movie Annan Thambi under the direction of Anwar Rasheed and starring Mammootty.

Filmography

Dubbing
2022 - Saudi Vellakka for Devi Varma

TV career
TV shows
Star Singer season 8- Promo (Asianet)
Ente Katha
Comedy Stars
The Happiness Project
Funny Nights with Pearle Maaney
Onnum Onnum Moonu
Panam Tharum Padam
 Super Kudumbam
Tharapakittu
TV serials
 Panchavadippalam (Flowers TV)
 Kasthooriman (Asianet)
John Jaffer Janardhan (Surya TV)
Adichu Mone (Flowers TV)

Dramas
 Snehithare Sookshikkuka
 Makarakoithu
 Swantham Karyam Zindabadh
 Sabarmathi

Awards

Kerala State Film Award 
2017-Kerala State Film Award for Second Best Actress -  '‘Ottamuri Velicham’', Ee.Ma.Yau

References

Indian actresses
Year of birth missing (living people)
Living people
Actresses in Malayalam cinema
Actresses in Malayalam television